The  was a commuter electric multiple unit (EMU) train type operated by Nagoya Railroad (Meitetsu) in Japan from 1986 to 2019.

Design
While broadly similar to the 5300 series trains built at the same time using electrical equipment from withdrawn rolling stock, the 5700 series trains were built from new.

Formations
, the 5700 series fleet consists of six four-car sets (5601 and 5701 to 5705). The last train was retired on 30 November 2019, with the introduction of the new 9500 series sets. No 5700 series cars have been preserved.

References

Electric multiple units of Japan
5700 series
Train-related introductions in 1986

ja:名鉄5700系電車
1500 V DC multiple units of Japan
Nippon Sharyo multiple units